Amsacrine (synonyms: m-AMSA, acridinyl anisidide) is an antineoplastic agent. 

It has been used in acute lymphoblastic leukemia.

Mechanism
Its planar fused ring system can intercalate into the DNA of tumor cells, thereby altering the major and minor groove proportions. These alterations to DNA structure inhibit both DNA replication and transcription by reducing association between the affected DNA and: DNA polymerase, RNA polymerase and transcription factors.

Amsacrine also expresses topoisomerase inhibitor activity, specifically inhibiting topoisomerase II. In contrast, the structurally similar o-AMSA differing in the position of the methoxy substituent group on the anilino-ring have little ability to poison topoisomerase II despite its intercalative behavior, suggesting that intercalation of the molecule in itself is insufficient to trap topoisomerase II as a covalent complex on DNA.

References 

Sulfonamides
Antineoplastic drugs
IARC Group 2B carcinogens
Acridines
O-methylated phenols
DNA intercalaters
Topoisomerase inhibitors